Grêmio Foot-Ball Porto Alegrense, commonly known as Grêmio, is a Brazilian professional football club based in Porto Alegre, capital city of the Brazilian state of Rio Grande do Sul. The club plays in the Campeonato Brasileiro Série A, the first division of the Brazilian football league system, and the Campeonato Gaúcho, Rio Grande do Sul's top state league. The club was founded in 1903 by European immigrants Englishman Andy Fairbank and German Paul Cochlin, although Grêmio's official website cites Cândido Dias da Silva and other 32 unnamed men as founders. Grêmio's home stadium is the Arena do Grêmio, which the team moved to in 2013. Prior to that, Grêmio played at Estádio Olímpico Monumental since 1954.

In 1983, Grêmio became champions of the Intercontinental Cup after defeating Hamburger SV 2-1. Additionally, Grêmio is tied with São Paulo, Santos, Palmeiras, and Flamengo for the most Copa CONMEBOL Libertadores de América titles, having won a total of three each.

As of 2017, Grêmio was ranked number one in the CBF club rankings and is listed by Forbes as the third most valuable football club in the Americas with an estimated value of $295.5 million. Grêmio has won 41 Campeonato Gaúcho, 2 Campeonato Brasileiro Série A, 1 Campeonato Brasileiro Série B, 1 Supercopa do Brasil, 1 Copa Sul and 5 Copa do Brasil. Internationally, Grêmio has won 1 Intercontinental Cup, 3 Copa Libertadores de América, 2 Recopa Sudamericana and 1 Sanwa Bank Cup. Grêmio usually plays in a tricolor (blue, black and white) striped shirt, black shorts and white socks, which originated the team's nickname.

Grêmio has a long-standing and intense rivalry with Internacional, which is widely regarded as one of the fiercest in Brazil and around the world. Matches between the two teams are known as Grenal and are highly anticipated events.

History

The beginning and professionalism at the club

On 7 September 1903, Brazil's first football team, Rio Grande, played an exhibition match in Porto Alegre. An entrepreneur from Sorocaba, São Paulo, named Cândido Dias was besotted with the sport and he went to watch the match. During the match, the ball deflated. As the only owner of a football in Porto Alegre, he lent his ball to the players and the match resumed. After the match, he talked to the local players about how to start a football club. On 15 September 1903, 32 people, including Cândido Dias, met at Salão Grau, a local restaurant and founded "Grêmio Foot-Ball Porto Alegrense". Most of the founding members were part of the city's German community. Carlos Luiz Bohrer was elected as first president.

The club's first match took place on 6 March 1904, against Fuss Ball Porto Alegre, the first of two matches played that day. Grêmio won the first match 1–0. Unfortunately, the name of the player who scored the club's first goal is lost to history. The trophy Grêmio won that day, the Wanderpreis, is still displayed at the club's museum. Within 5 months the club had inaugurated the Baixada, its first home.

On 18 July 1909, Grêmio beat Internacional 10–0 on the latter's debut game. Grêmio's goalkeeper Kallfelz reportedly left the field to chat with fans during the match. Even now this victory is remembered with pride by Gremistas (Grêmio supporters). The match was the starting point for a rivalry that rages on to this day. Grêmio was one of the founding members of the Porto Alegre football league in 1910, and in 1911 won the league for the first time. On 25 August 1912, in a city league match, Grêmio beat Sport Clube Nacional of Porto Alegre 23–0. Sisson scored 14 goals in the match to record Grêmio's biggest ever win. In 1918, Grêmio became a founding member of the  Fundação Rio-Grandense de Desportes (later known as Federação Gaúcha de Futebol), a federation that organized the first state championships in Rio Grande do Sul. The first championship was scheduled for 1918, but the Spanish flu epidemic forced the event to be postponed until 1919. In 1921, a year after the arrival of legendary goalkeeper Eurico Lara, Grêmio won its first state championship.

On 7 July 1911, Grêmio beat Uruguay's national team 2–1. In 1931, Grêmio became one of the first teams in Brazil to play matches at night after installing floodlights at Estádio Baixada. On 19 May 1935, Grêmio became the first team from Rio Grande do Sul to beat a team from the state of São Paulo (considered the strongest Brazilian league at the time) by defeating Santos 3–2. Grêmio was also the first club outside Rio de Janeiro state to play at the Maracanã Stadium, defeating Flamengo 3–1 in 1950.

During this period, Grêmio started to earn a reputation abroad. In 1932 it played its first international match in Rivera (Uruguay). In 1949, the match against Uruguay's Nacional ended in a 3–1 win for Grêmio and the players received a hero's welcome on their return to Porto Alegre. In that same year, Grêmio played for the first time in Central America. Between 1953 and 1954, Grêmio travelled to Mexico, Ecuador and Colombia, a tour dubbed "the conquest of the Americas". On 25 February 1959, Grêmio defeated Boca Juniors 4–1 in Buenos Aires, becoming the first foreign team to beat Boca at La Bombonera.

In 1961, Grêmio went on its first European tour playing 24 games in 11 countries: France, Romania, Belgium, Greece, Germany, Poland, Bulgaria, Luxembourg, Denmark, Estonia and Russia. The Gremistas (Grêmio fans) were growing in number. 1946 saw the first appearance of the club's motto  "com o Grêmio onde o Grêmio estiver" ("with Grêmio wherever Grêmio may be"), which was later written into Grêmio's official anthem. An anthem penned by Lupicinio Rodrigues, a samba-cancao composer who became one of the most famous and revered Grêmio fans. The anthem celebrates the Gremistas reputation for attending all Grêmio matches, regardless of the difficulties and obstacles they might have to overcome to see their club. In the late 1950s, Grêmio joined the Taça Brasil, as the Brazilian league was known at the time. The team reached the Taça Brasil semi-finals in 1959, 1963 and 1967. In 1968, the team won its first international title in a friendly cup with teams from Brazil and Uruguay. In 1954, Grêmio inaugurated what was at the time the biggest private stadium in Brazil, the Olímpico Stadium. In 1971, the Taça Brasil championship was replaced by the Campeonato Brasileiro with the first goal ever scored in the Campeonato Brasileiro coming from Grêmio's Néstor Scotta, an Argentine, in a match against São Paulo at Estádio do Morumbi. Grêmio maintained a series of respectable results in Campeonato Brasileiro, usually achieving a top half finish.

Valdir Espinosa and the Intercontinental Cup 1983

Grêmio's first dominant period in South American football began in the early 1980s. Propelled by the completion of their new stadium, the Olímpico Monumental.

Grêmio won its first Campeonato Brasileiro on 3 May 1981, after defeating São Paulo at the Morumbi Stadium in São Paulo. The scores in the two-leg final were 2–1 at Olímpico and 1–0 for Grêmio at Morumbi. The winning goal was scored by striker Baltazar. Earlier, on 26 April 1981 Olímpico had its biggest attendance ever, when 98,421 fans watched Grêmio lose to Ponte Preta 0–1 in the Campeonato Brasileiro semi-final.

1983 was the most successful year in Grêmio's history. First, Grêmio won the South-American Copa Libertadores, after a consistent yet eventful campaign. One of the matches of the semi-final, the 3–3 draw against Estudiantes at Jorge Luis Hirschi Stadium, became legendary for its belligerence on and off the pitch and is dubbed the "Batalha de La Plata" ("Battle of La Plata"). In the finals, Grêmio beat the 1982 South America and World champions Peñarol from Uruguay, with a 1–1 draw in Montevideo and a 2–1 win in Porto Alegre. The winning goal was scored by César just before the end of the match. A year later, Grêmio was runner-up in the Copa Libertadores final, being defeated by Argentina's Independiente.

Also in 1983, Grêmio won the Intercontinental Cup after defeating Hamburger SV of Germany 2–1. Renato Portaluppi scored both goals. With Uruguayan defender De León and goalkeeper Mazaropi also earning club legend status on the back of their performances in the Copa Libertadores and Intercontinental Cup. Porto Alegre, was deafened by the gremista's chant of: "The Earth is Blue". Soon after winning the Intercontinental Cup, Grêmio beat America of Mexico in Los Angeles, and won the Los Angeles Cup.

In 1989, Grêmio won the first Copa do Brasil, a Brazilian knockout cup featuring football teams from all around the country. After humiliating Flamengo with a 6–1 win in the second leg of the semi-finals, Grêmio defeated Sport Recife in the final, with a 0–0 draw in Recife and a 2–1 win in Porto Alegre.

In 1991, after a poor season, Grêmio was relegated for the first time to the Brazilian Second Division but gained immediate promotion back to the Campeonato Brasileiro's elite the following season (1993). After this return to form, 1994 saw Grêmio win its second Copa do Brasil, defeating Ceará in the two-leg final (0–0 and 1–0), the solitary goal scored by striker Nildo. This win kickstarted the club's Tokyo Project. On 11 December 1994, Grêmio had to play three matches in a single day during the 1994 Campeonato Gaúcho, with kick-off times of 2PM, 4PM, and 6PM, due to their extensive schedule. They won two and drew the third match, using a total of 34 different players.

Luiz Felipe Scolari and the Libertadores 1995

In May 1995, under head coach Luiz Felipe Scolari, Grêmio were runners-up in the Copa do Brasil, losing the final match to Corinthians 0–1 at Olímpico Monumental. In August, a few days after beating arch-rivals Internacional for the state title with a reserve squad, the club won the Copa Libertadores for the second time. Defeating Atlético Nacional of Colombia 3–1 in Porto Alegre and drawing 1–1 in Medellín. The tournament was marked by fierce matches against Palmeiras in the quarter-finals. Palmeiras had perhaps the best squad on the competition, with players such as Rivaldo, Cafu, Edmundo, César Sampaio, Antônio Carlos, Roberto Carlos and Mancuso. They were soundly beaten by Grêmio in the 1st leg in an epic 5–0 match with a hat-trick from Mário Jardel. Palmeiras beat Grêmio 5–1 in the return leg, with Jardel's lone strike proving enough to see Grêmio through to the Semi-finals.

This qualified the club to the World Club tournament where Grêmio pushed a talented Ajax (Featuring Patrick Kluivert, Overmars, Van Der Sar and Kanu) into extra time and penalties despite being a player down.  Early 1996 saw Grêmio win the Recopa Sudamericana, beating Argentina's Independiente 4–1.

On 15 December 1996, Grêmio won its second Campeonato Brasileiro, defeating Portuguesa in the final. Portuguesa won the first match at home 2–0, and therefore Grêmio was forced to win the final match at Porto Alegre by the same score or more. Grêmio got to 2–0, with midfielder Ailton scoring the second goal a few minutes before the final whistle. Grêmio won the title due to their higher finish in the league.

In 1997, Grêmio won their third Copa do Brasil title. In the finals against Romário's Flamengo, Grêmio won on away goals after a 0–0 draw in Porto Alegre and a 2–2 draw in Rio de Janeiro. Four years later, in 2001, Grêmio won their fourth Copa do Brasil, defeating Corinthians. The first leg of the final, in Porto Alegre, finished with the score of 2–2. The second game in São Paulo ended with a 3–1 Grêmio victory, in a match which is regarded as one of the finest in Grêmio's history.

Batalha dos Aflitos and the Libertadores 2007

In 2004, after performing poorly for two consecutive seasons in the Série A, Grêmio finished bottom of the league and were relegated to Campeonato Brasileiro's Second Division. Grêmio's promotion battle was difficult, with only two clubs able to qualify for promotion to the First Division. On 26 November 2005, at Estádio dos Aflitos, Recife, Grêmio had four players sent off and two penalty given kicks against them in a tumultuous match that has become known as "The Battle of the Aflitos" ("A Batalha dos Aflitos", "Aflitos" being the name of Náutico's home field).

Bruno Carvalho bounced the first penalty bounced off the post in the first half when Grêmio still had 11 players on the field; the second was saved by goalkeeper Galatto when had been reduced to 7 men. Within 72 seconds of Galatto saving the penalty 17-year-old Anderson had made a run down the left flank to slot the ball into the back of the net to score Grêmio's winning goal. A goal that sealed the Série B championship and promotion to the Série A.

On 9 April 2006, at Estádio Beira-Rio, Grêmio won the state championship against Internacional, preventing them from winning a fifth title in a row. Playing away, Grêmio managed to obtain a 1–1 draw in the second leg of the final, enough to secure the title on away goals. Grêmio players said after the match that there were more than 50,000 Internacional fans in Beira Rio's Stadium and they could still hear the noise made by 6,000 Gremistas. In 2007, at Estádio Olímpico Monumental, Grêmio won the Campeonato Gaúcho once again this time against Juventude.

Also in 2007, Grêmio reached the final of the 2007 Copa Libertadores. Throughout the campaign the team overcame away losses by putting in heroic home performances and earning the moniker of Imortal Tricolor. This also pumped up the fans who even after a heavy 3–0 away defeat to Boca Juniors formed huge lines to buy tickets for the final game in Porto Alegre. with some of the fans queuing for four days or more. Unfortunately fan fervor wasn't enough with Riquelme's magnificent performance handing Boca Juniors a 2–0 win and the Copa Libertadores title.

Recent history and the Libertadores 2017

In 2008, after the sudden firing of their head coach Vagner Mancini, the club hired Celso Roth. Within a month they had prematurely dropped out of both the domestic cup (Copa do Brasil) and their state championship (Campeonato Gaúcho). This led to the team going through a state of crisis and, soon after, major renovation. They were expected to finish in the bottom half of the Campeonato Brasileiro but managed to finish in second place. For many supporters, even that was considered a failure as in the first half of the championship, the team was in fine form and even considered the best in the country. At the halfway point of the season the team had a 10-point lead over second place that they would eventually surrender in the final games of the season.

2012 marked the last year of the club's former stadium, Olímpico Monumental. Fan expectations were high but were not matched by the team's performance. Grêmio did, however, qualify for the Libertadores the following year.

In 2014, the club once again qualified for the Copa Libertadores de América and signed Enderson Moreira as the new manager. However, after a successful campaign in the group stage, Grêmio failed in the competition and were eliminated by San Lorenzo in the Round of 16. A few days before, the club was defeated 6–2 on aggregate by their biggest rival, the Internacional, in the finals of the Campeonato Gaúcho. With nothing more than a regular campaign at the beginning of the Série A, club president Fábio Koff signed Luiz Felipe Scolari as the new coach of the team. The club also invested in Giuliano, the biggest hiring of the year.

In 2015, former Grêmio player Roger Machado was hired as the new manager. A short lived but initially successful run, Machado's time with Grêmio saw them qualify for the 2016 Copa Libertadores with a finish in the Campeonato Brasileiro in 3rd place. Machado oversaw a famous victory over beat bitter rivals Internacional with a 5–0 drubbing in "Grenal" No. 407. Nonetheless, towards the end of the year, the team began to show a lack of organization, especially in its defensive system. As fan support dwindled, Roger announced his resignation after a 3–0 loss against Ponte Preta in September 2016. Renato Portaluppi replaced him and under his guidance a resurgent Grêmio became champions of the Copa do Brasil against Atlético Mineiro in a 4–2 aggregate score, making them the Brazilian club with the most titles in this tournament (5). After this historic feat, fans affectionately nicknamed Grêmio the "Rei de Copas" (King of Cups).

In 2017, Grêmio won their third Libertadores, after defeating Club Atlético Lanús 1–0 at Arena do Grêmio, followed by a 2–1 victory in Estadio Ciudad de Lanús. Luan was named the player of the tournament, while goalkeeper Marcelo Grohe performed spectacularly with a heroic, almost impossible save in the semi-final match against Barcelona Sporting Club. They became the third Brazilian club to win a third Copa Libertadores, after São Paulo and Santos.

The club went on to represent CONMEBOL at the 2017 FIFA Club World Cup, held in the United Arab Emirates. Grêmio beat Pachuca 1–0 in a tight semi-final, the goal coming from Everton in extra-time. They were beaten 0–1 by Real Madrid in the final.

2018 Season and Libertadores
Grêmio once again finished 4th in the 2018 Campeonato Brasileiro securing a place in the Copa Libertadores de América
having been knocked out in the semi-final of the tournament on goal-difference in 2018 by a late River Plate goal to end the match 2–2. The goal was scored from a penalty, given on review of a handball by the VAR from Matheus Bressan in the 95th minute. Bressan was subsequently transferred. In the hours following the match it was revealed that River Plate manager Marcelo Gallardo had broken the rules of his touchline ban at half-time by entering the River dressing room. Grêmio appealed the result within 24 hours of the final whistle based on this information. It took CONMEBOL 2 days to deliberate, deciding that the result should stand, with Gallardo receiving a $50,000 fine and a 4-match suspension (1 from the Bombonera Stadium for the first leg of the Libertadores final against Boca Juniors and 3 subsequent touchline bans). River Plate would go on to win the Copa Libertadores de América after further controversy.

In the 2020 season Grêmio met their rivals Internacional at Copa Libertadores for the first time in history. The first leg at the Arena do Grêmio ended in controversy as a fight broke out between Grêmio's Pepê and Inter's Moisés which quickly escalated into a full-brawl between the two teams and eight players — three of each team in the field and more two from the bench — were sent off. The match ended on a tie.

2021 crises, relegation and return 
The 2020 saw a decline on the performance of the team, while they were able to secure the Campeonato Gaúcho, they finished in 6th in the Brasileirão which didn't guarantee their berth to the Libertadores for the first time since 2013, having to play at the qualifying stages. The team later fail to qualify to the 2021 Copa Libertadores after losing to Ecuador's Independiente del Valle. The defeat ended up causing the resignation of Renato Portaluppi, who had worked at the club for almost five years.

In 2021, Grêmio was elected the best club in South America of the decade, between the years 2011-2020, in a survey carried out by the International Federation of Football History & Statistics (IFFHS). The ranking took into account the points scored by clubs in the organization's Club World Ranking each year.

Portaluppi's replacement was Tiago Nunes, with whom Grêmio qualified for the next phase of the Copa Sudamericana and won the Campeonato Gaúcho in the final played against Internacional. However, the COVID-19 pandemic caused various infections among the squad, which combined with other factors resulted in a weak performance at the 2021 Campeonato Brasileiro, getting just two points from seven games and dropping to bottom of the league table. Nunes was fired and replaced with Luiz Felipe Scolari, in turn, also failed to lead the club out of the relegation zone and ended up leaving by mutual agreement after three months of work. Vagner Mancini, then America Mineiro coach, was hired for his place in October. Without achieving results, Grêmio finished the championship relegated for the third time to the Campeonato Brasileiro Série B.

After a weak start in the 2022 Campeonato Gaúcho, Mancini was fired and replaced with Roger Machado, who led to the team to a fifth Gauchão title in sequence after a victory against rival's Internacional in the semi-finals and the finals against Ypiranga. The Série B campaign was enough to guarantee access to return to the Série A in 2023.

In December 2022, Grêmio announced that Luis Suárez would be joining the club for a two-year contract. The signing drew worldwide attention to the club. Suárez made his debut on 17 January 2023 in a match against São Luiz for the 2023 Recopa Gaúcha. Suárez scored a hat-trick in a 4–1 win.

Symbols

Stars
According to the club, the gold star represents the victory in the World Club Championship; the silver represents the three South American competition victories; and the bronze one represents the National competitions. There is also a gold star in Grêmio's flag that represents a player, Everaldo, the sole Grêmio player in the 1970 Brazilian World Cup winning team.

Flag
The first club flag was unveiled by the club during the opening ceremony for the Baixada stadium. At that time, it had a horizontal stripe of blue, black and white, with a medallion on the left top corner.
The Brazilian Flag was the inspiration for the Tricolor's standard from 1918 to 1944.

Anthem
Grêmio's anthem is one of the most critically acclaimed in all of Brazilian football, other than the anthems of the clubs from Rio de Janeiro (all composed by Lamartine Babo), it is the only football anthem composed by a renowned composer, Lupicínio Rodrigues. Featuring a vivid melody in the style of a march, the anthem features the famous verses: Até a pé nós iremos / para o que der e vier / mas o certo é que nós estaremos / com o Grêmio onde o Grêmio estiver (Even on foot we will go / against all obstacles / but we sure will be / with Grêmio wherever Grêmio may be). Grêmio supporters boast that Grêmio, as the anthem hints, has never played without supporters anywhere in the world.

Eurico Lara, a goalkeeper who played for the club in the 1920s and in the 1930s, is mentioned in the anthem, where he is called the immortal idol (or craque imortal, in Portuguese).

Team kit

Grêmio tricolour scheme is made up of blue, black and white, an unusual colour combination for football shirts. The first Grêmio kit was inspired by English club Exeter City. At the time, the original kit included a black cap, striped shirt in blue and havana (a variation of brown), white tie, white shorts and black socks. Subsequently, the uniform was changed to blue and black due to the lack of havana fabric. Soon after, vertical white stripes were included in the kit creating a pattern that is used to the present day. Because of this pattern, Grêmio is commonly referred as the "Tricolor". The Grêmio colors are set in the club statute as so;

 Home colors – Vertical stripes of light blue and black, with white piping;
 Away colors – White with blue and black detail;
 Alternative colors – Dark Blue or blue with white details.

Kit evolution
Grêmio kits throughout its history:

Sponsorship

It was in the early 1980s that Grêmio received its first official sponsor, with the Brazilian Olympikus providing sports equipment. The partnership lasted until early 1983, when, on account of the brilliant moment that had been living in tjheir history, the Grêmio has signed a contract with a German Adidas to supply sports material. However, the partnership was short-lived, as in 1985, with the end of the contract with Adidas, a new supplier emerged, returning to the national level with Penalty. In 1987, for the first time in its history the Grêmio signed a sponsorship agreement for stamping the shirt, with Coca-Cola. This turn in their campaigns unprecedentedly exchanged their traditional red logo for black, because this color belongs to International, its biggest rival, and it was vetoed by Grêmio.

Sponsorship of Penalty and Coca-Cola persisted with Grêmio for nearly a decade until, in 1995, the soft drink brand left the main sponsor of the shirts, which was assumed by Tintas Renner, a paint manufacturer, until 1997. In 1998, General Motors assumed this position, exposing numerous names of vehicles throughout the partnership. At the beginning of the 21st century, Penalty left the club, with the Italian Kappa providing sports equipment.

In 2001, for the payment of debts, Grêmio closed an agreement with the state government of Rio Grande do Sul, exposing Banrisul banking mark on his shirt. However, after payment, it was Banrisul who assumed the payments and became the master sponsor of the club. In 2005 the contract with Kappa came to an end, after this, kits were the responsibility of another German in club history, Puma. Also from this era, Grêmio opened more spaces for smaller sponsors, with the first being Tramontina, Unimed, TIM and the return of Coca-Cola. In 2011, once again changing the supplier of sports equipment occurs, this time taking the Brazilian Topper, under the value of €4.8 million per season, which operates in the South American market, with a contract until the end of 2014. Beginning in 2015 season, the British company Umbro supplied sports equipment of Grêmio, paying the value of €6 million per year.

Stadium

Grêmio's original stadium was the Estádio da Baixada, built in 1904 at the upper class neighbourhood of Moinhos de Vento in Porto Alegre. It was made to please the city's growing colony of Germans, who were concentrated in the region. The Estádio da Baixada hosted Grêmio until 1954.

The second stadium was the Estádio Olímpico Monumental. It was inaugurated on 19 September 1954 as Estádio Olímpico, located in the neighbourhood of Azenha.  At the time it was the largest private stadium in Brazil. Estádio Olímpico's first game was between Grêmio and Nacional from Uruguay; Grêmio won by a score of 2–0, with both goals scored by Vítor.
In 1980 a second tier was added to the Olímpico, and the stadium was renamed the Olímpico Monumental. The first game at the renamed Olímpico Monumental was played on 21 June 1980, when Grêmio beat Vasco da Gama by a score of 1–0.
Estádio Olímpico Monumental has an attendance record of 98,421 people for the game against Ponte Preta on 26 April 1981.

By the 2000s, the board of directors start to study what to do with the aging Olímpico, the stadium did not meet the club's expectations, due to the construction's lifetime, high maintenance costs, low comfort standards, low quality of services, poor security, insufficient parking and a highly populated region. The club instead decided to build a new stadium. The project was approved in 2008 and the construction of a new stadium started in September 2010.

In 2012, Grêmio moved into their new stadium, Arena do Grêmio, a big multi-use stadium in Porto Alegre. Its capacity is 55,225 and is one of the most modern venues in South America. The inaugural match in Arena was a friendly against Hamburger SV on 8 December 2012. The attendance record was of 52,223 people at the 2016 Copa do Brasil Finals against Atlético Minero. The Arena also hosted the first leg of the 2017 Copa Libertadores Finals against Lanús.

The club also rents the Estádio Antônio Vieira Ramos in the city of Gravataí, in the metropolitan region of Porto Alegre, as the home stadium for its women's team.

Training centre

The first location for training  used by Grêmio was the additional field built next door of Estádio Olímpico Monumental. However, it can not be exactly characterized as a training centre. In 2000  the construction of the first training centre of the club, the CT Hélio Dourado, in Eldorado do Sul, in the metropolitan region of Porto Alegre was completed, but, because of it being located quite far away, it ended up being used for club's Academy.

In 2014,the construction of the new training center of Grêmio, the CT Luiz Carvalho, located next to the Arena do Grêmio, in Porto Alegre was finished. It is adjacent to the Guaíba River, and has one of the most beautiful views of the city with the stadium and a cable-stayed bridge in the background.

Supporters
Grêmio fans are called "gremistas" or "tricolores". Originally, Grêmio was a club heavily supported by Brazilians of German descent of Rio Grande do Sul. Over time, that distinction has reduced, and today the fan base is very diverse. The club, together with Internacional, divide the population of Rio Grande do Sul; Grêmio is also the most popular club in western Santa Catarina and south-west Paraná. The club has around 8 million fans in the country, meaning that, in terms of ranking, the club is the 6th most supporters in the Brazil. The largest outside the Rio de Janeiro-São Paulo axis. A 2022 research pointed out that Grêmio has the most "loyal" fans in Brazil. The survey that measured the size of the fans in the country identified that 90.6% of Grêmio fans say they support Grêmio exclusively and that only 9.4% of Grêmio supporters supported or sympathized with another Brazilian football team. Grêmio associates 92,000 people.

Geral do Grêmio

The largest group of Grêmio supporters is Geral do Grêmio, the first and largest Brazilian barra brava, movement similar to European ultras and Brazil's own torcidas organizadas, but with unique characteristics of Latin America. The group was created during the year 2001 with Grêmio fans watching games from the seats behind the southern goal at Estádio Olímpico Monumental (an area of the stands called "Geral", as in "general", where tickets had lower costs). Over the following years, more people joined the movement, and they decided to collectively call themselves by the name of the area from where they watched the games. A unique and traditional feature of the crowd is running down the stand (a movement called the "avalanche"), pressing against the fence when a goal is scored as a way to also embrace the players in celebration.

Being a barra brava, the Geral do Grêmio has differences with the ultras and the torcidas organizadas. They are a free membership group (which means that they do not charge a monthly fee), do not have their own uniforms, nor control over who participates. On games they bring a band consisting of percussion and blowing instruments, dictating the rhythm of the chants throughout the game, never stopping or sitting. Banners and flags are exhibited in the length of the sector in which they are located inside the stadium, bringing a unique identity to their supporters. Also, wherever possible, they use flare, smoke bombs, fire extinguishers, among other materials to encourage the team on the field. In the Arena do Grêmio, which opened in December 2012, the lower northern stand was built with no chairs, with the Geral crowd and its "avalanche" celebration in mind. Later the avalanche celebration was made impossible by the addition of security metal bars.

The Geral enjoys good relationships with some other torcidas organizadas in Brazil, but due the inspiration on the platinean barra bravas, the Geral has a strong bond with Nacional's La Banda Del Parque. Members of both groups frequently do confraternizations together, and members frequently attend each other's games.

Other supporters 
Other supporters group includes the Torcida Jovem do Grêmio (Young Grêmio supporters), the oldest in operation, founded in 1977 and was considered the main supporters group until the late 1990s; the Super Raça Gremista, Garra Tricolor, Máfia Tricolor and the Velha Escola (Old School, a schism from the Geral). There are also exclusively female supporters group, such as the Núcleo de Mulheres Gremistas and the Elis Vive Collective.

Rivalries

Grenal 

As the years went on, Grêmio and another important football club from Porto Alegre, Internacional, started to form a rivalry. Soon the games between these two clubs got their own name, Grenal, and resulted in record attendance. The rivalry divides the state of Rio Grande do Sul and the city of Porto Alegre in half. It is one of the fiercest football rivalries in Brazil, South America and the world. It is accompanied by high levels of emotion, competition and occasional violence.

The first match was held in 1909, Grêmio won the first Grenal in history by the score of 10 to 0. The team led the statistics of Grenais in the first years of dispute until they were surpassed in 1945 by Internacional, which held the advantage in victories until today.

In 1935, Eurico Lara, who was Grêmio's goalie, conceded a penalty kick. When the Internacional player was about to kick it, Lara's brother stopped the game and reminded him of his doctor's recommendation that he didn't overexert himself. He didn't listen. Soon the Internacional player took the shot. Lara caught it, but as soon as he did he fell sideways and didn't move. He was substituted after the wondrous save, and Grêmio won the game. But unfortunately he died two months later as a result of the fatigue from that game. Lara has been immortalized in the club anthem.

Gre-Ju 
Gre-Ju is another derby of Rio Grande do Sul, between Grêmio and Juventude from Caxias do Sul. For most of its history, the rivalry was one-sided as Juventude was traditionally a weaker team, but it heated up in the 1990s as Juventude grew to be the third powerhouse of the state.

Players

First team squad

For recent transfers, see 2023 Grêmio F.B.P.A. Transfers.

Reserves squad

Other players under contract

Out on loan

Club officials

Board members
 President: Alberto Guerra
 Vice-president of football: Paulo Caleffi
 Vice-president: Eduardo Magrisso
 Vice-president: Fábio Floriani
 Vice-president: Geraldo Correa
 Vice-president: Gustavo Bolognesi
 Vice-president: José Carlos Corrêa Duarte
 Vice-president: Luciano Feldens
 Director of football: Antonio Brum
 Chief executive officer (CEO): Márcio Pinto Ramos
 Advisor of presidency: Gustavo Zanchi
 General secretary: Kevin Krieger

Coaching staff
 Manager: Renato Portaluppi
 Assistant coach: Alexandre Mendes
 Assistant coach: Marcelo Salles
 Fitness coach: Reverson Pimentel
 Assistant fitness coach: Gabriel Gindri Alves
 Assistant fitness coach: Márcio Pereira
 Goalkeeper coach: Mauri Lima
 Assistant goalkeeper coach: Enio Oliveira
 Football administrative manager: Marcelo Rudolph
 Technical observer: Gustavo Fragoso
 Performance analyst: Antônio Cruz
 Performance analyst: Gustavo Somavilla
 Performance analyst: Paulo Timm
 Performance analyst: Rafael Tavares
 Market analyst: Lucas Sacchet

Medical staff
 Medical director: Ciro Simoni
 Doctor: Gabriel Severo
 Doctor: Márcio Dornelles
 Doctor: Paulo Rabaldo
 Massagist: Anderson Meurer
 Massagist: José Flores
 Massagist: Lucas Cruz
 Massagist: Marco Aurélio
 Nutritionist: Guilherme Oliveira
 Nutritionist: Tiago Fontoura
 Physiologist: Marco Aurélio Melo
 Physiotherapist: Felipe Coimbra
 Physiotherapist: Gustavo Pacheco Cardoso
 Physiotherapist: Luiz Peres
 Physiotherapist: Marcos Ganga
 Physiotherapist: Thiago Albuquerque
 Nurse: Adriano Welter

Other staff
 Press officer: Márcio Neves
 Press officer: Vitor Rodriguez
 Logistics supervisor: Pedro Aguiar
 Equipment manager: Danilo Bueno
 Equipment manager: Diego Simões
 Assistant equipment manager: Antônio Marcos
 Cameraman: Juares Dagort
 Butler: Paulo Oliveira
 Chief security: Luiz Fernando Cardoso
 Security: André Trisch
 Security: Cristiano Nunes
 Security: José Nolan Pedroso
 Security: Pedro Carvalho
 Security: Sandro Gonçalves
 Caretaker: João Moacir da Luz
 Motorist: Antonio Machado
 Knave: João Brito
 Maintenance technician: Higino Duarte Luciano

Managerial history

Honours

Football

Professional

 
  shared record

 Note (1): Although the Intercontinental Cup and the FIFA Club World Cup are officially different tournaments, in Brazil they are often treated as the same tournament.

Friendly

International

Troféu Fronteira da Paz (URU) (1): 2010
Taça Hang Ching (CHN) (1): 1998
Pepsi Cola Cup (CHN) (1): 1998
Troféu Colombino (SPA) (1): 1997
Troféu Agrupación Peñas Valencianas (SPA) (1): 1996
Copa Renner (1): 1996
Philips Cup (SWI) (1): 1987
Philips Cup (NED) (1): 1986
Rotterdam AD-Tournament (NED) (1): 1985
Troféu Ciudad de Palma de Mallorca (SPA) (1): 1985
Troféu 'CEL' (SLV) (1): 1983
Los Angeles Cup (USA) (1): 1983
Troféu Ciudad de Valladolid (SPA) (1): 1981
Troféu Torre del Vigia (URU) (1): 1981
Copa El Salvador del Mundo (SLV) (1): 1981
Troféu Ciudad de Rosário (ARG) (1): 1979
Taça Cidade de Salvador (BRA) (1): 1972
Taça do Atlântico (1): 1971
Copa Internacional de Porto Alegre (BRA) (1): 1971
Taça Río de La Plata (1): 1968
Troféu Internacional de Salônica (GRE) (1): 1962
Troféu Internacional de Atenas (GRE) (1): 1961
Copa José González Artigas (ECU) (1): 1954
Troféu Sadrep (URU) (1): 1949
Copa El President de la Republica de Costa Rica (CRC) (1): 1949

National

Troféu João Saldanha (1): 2010
Troféu Osmar Santos (1): 2008
Taça Ironcryl (1): 1997
Taça Presidente Médici (1): 1971
Troféu Domingos Garcia Filho (1): 1970
Taça Petrobrás (1): 1970
Copa Tancredo Neves (1): 1960
Copa Revista do Esporte (1): 1960
Taça Correio do Povo (1): 1949
Taça Columbia Pictures (1): 1940
Taça General Flores da Cunha (1): 1935

Regional

Troféu Rádio Gaúcha 90 Anos (RS) (1): 2017
Troféu Rádio Bandeirantes 80 Anos (RS) (1): 2014
Taça Rádio Pelotense 85 Anos (RS) (1): 2010
Copa Solidariedade (RS) (1): 1995
Taça RBS TV 25 Anos (RS) (1): 1988
Troféu Sesquicentenário da Revolução Farroupilha (RS) (1): 1985
Torneio 'Festa da Uva' (RS) (1): 1965
Torneio Início Estadual (RS) (3): 1963, 1965, 1967
Troféu Wallig (RS) (1): 1962
Taça Jubileu de Prata da Refinaria Ipiranga (RS) (1): 1962
Copa Farroupilha 120 Anos (1): 1955
Taça Bento Gonçalves (1): 1952
Taça Rádio Gaúcha (1): 1952
Taça Manuel Amorim Albuquerque (1): 1950
Campeonato Extra de Porto Alegre (2): 1948, 1949
Taça Cidade de Porto Alegre (2): 1948, 1996
Taça General Corrêa Lima (1): 1946
Taça Casa Sport (1): 1946
Taça 'Dia do Futebol' (1): 1945
Taça Ernesto Dorneles (1): 1943
Taça Cambial (2): 1942, 1943
Campeonato Gaúcho de Amadores (1): 1942
Campeonato Metropolitano de Amadores (1): 1942
Taça de Portugal (1): 1940
Taça José Loureiro da Silva (1): 1938
Taça 'Dia do Filiado' (1): 1938
Taça Café Nacional (1): 1938
Taça Martel (2): 1936, 1937
Torneio 'Benefício da FRGD'(1): 1935
Taça Flores da Cunha 1): 1934
Taça 'Dia do Cronista' (7): 1933, 1944, 1956, 1960, 1961, 1962, 1968
Taça 'Dia do Desporto' (1): 1932
Torneio de Encerramento de Porto Alegre (3): 1931, 1933, 1938
Torneio de Preparação de Porto Alegre (1): 1929
Taça Reivindicação (1): 1929
Taça Fernando Caldas (1): 1928
Torneio Washington Luis (1): 1926
Torneio FC Porto Alegre (1): 1926
Taça São Pedro (1): 1924
Taça Associação dos Varejistas (2): 1923, 1924
Torneio Início de Porto Alegre (14): 1922, 1926, 1927, 1931, 1937, 1939, 1946, 1947, 1948, 1949, 1958, 1963, 1965, 1967
Taça Rio Branco (3): 1914, 1915, 1916
Taça Sportiva (1): 1909
Troféu Wanderpreis (8): 1904, 1905*, 1905*, 1906, 1907, 1910, 1911, 1912

Woman

Copa Sul (1): 2002
Campeonato Gaúcho de Futebol Feminino (4): 2000, 2001, 2018, 2022
Copa de Inverno de Gramado (RS) (1): 1998
Copa 90 Anos do EC Pelotas (1): 1998

Futsal

Copa Atlântico Sul (1): 1987
Taça Governador do Estado (RS) (1): 1976
Campeonato Metropolitano (2): 1973, 1974

Football 7
Liga das Américas (1): 2020
Campeonato Gaúcho (1): 2020
Taça Governador (1): 2020

Basketball

Campeonato Gaúcho (3): 1934, 1954, 1955

Volleyball

Campeonato Gaúcho (2): 1929, 1934
Campeonato Citadino (6): 1930, 1931, 1932, 1933, 1934, 1935

Tennis

Campeonato Gaúcho (1): 1926

Table Tennis

Campeonato Citadino (1): 1949

Boxing

Campeonato Gaúcho (3): 1949, 1950, 1951

Sport of Athletics

Troféu Brasil de Atletismo (2): 1958, 1959
Campeonato Gaúcho de Atletismo Masculino (16): 1934, 1935, 1936, 1956, 1957, 1958, 1959, 1960, 1961, 1962, 1963, 1964, 1965, 1966, 1967, 1968
Campeonato Gaúcho de Atletismo Feminino (8): 1951, 1953, 1959, 1960, 1961, 1965, 1966, 1972

Campeonato Brasileiro record

References

Websites

Books
 Enciclopédia do Futebol Brasileiro, Volume 1 – Lance, Rio de Janeiro: Aretê Editorial S/A, 2001.
 Especial Placar – 500 Times do Brasil, São Paulo: Editora Abril: 2003.

External links

 

 Geral do Grêmio official website. Geral do Grêmio.
 Coleção Grêmio Gianfranco . The best online collection of Grêmio memorabilia; organized by Gianfranco Spolaore.

 
Football clubs in Brazil
Football clubs in Rio Grande do Sul
Football clubs in Porto Alegre
Association football clubs established in 1903
Copa Libertadores winning clubs
Recopa Sudamericana winning clubs
Intercontinental Cup winning clubs
Copa do Brasil winning clubs
Campeonato Brasileiro Série A winning clubs